Knattspyrnudeild Vestra, also known as Vestri, is the football department of the Íþróttafélagið Vestri multi-sport club and is based in Ísafjarðarbær, Iceland.

Men's

History
The club was founded in 1986 as the football department of Badmintonfélag Ísafjarðar, or BÍ for short. It first participated in the Icelandic tier-4 league, then known as 4. deild karla, that same year and their first coach was former Icelandic international player Björn Helgason. In 1988, Ísafjörður biggest club, Íþróttabandalag Ísafjarðar (ÍBÍ), folded after years of financial difficulties and most of their players moved over to BÍ who took over as the town's major football club. The club took up the name BÍ'88 to mark the new beginning and Jóhann Króknes Torfason was hired as the head coach. They won their group in 4. deild convincingly, scoring 46 goals while conceding only 3, with their biggest win being an 18–0 victory over Höfrungur. In the 4. deild playoff they came out on top and achieved promotion to 3. deild karla where they played the next three years. In 1991 the team achieved promotion to 2. deild karla after finishing as runner-up's in 3. deild. They played there for two years before being relegated back to 3. deild. After the 1996 season, the club withdrew from play due to financial difficulties.

From 2006 to 2016 the team fielded a joint team with Ungmennafélag Bolungarvíkur, called BÍ/Bolungarvík. In 2008 the team was promoted to 2. deild karla and in 2010 to 1. deild karla. In October 2010 the team hired Guðjón Þórðarson as their manager. In 2016 the club merged into Íþróttafélagið Vestri along with Skellur (Volleyball), Sundfélagið Vestri (Swim) and KFÍ (Basketball).

On 21 September 2019, Vestri won a 7–0 victory against Tindastóll in the last game of the season and secured a promotion to the second-tier 1. deild karla.

Current squad

Out on loan

Player of the year
{|
|-
|valign="top"|

Top scorers by season

Players in bold are currently playing for Vestri.

Former notable players
Players who have played for Vestri (Badmintonfélag Ísafjarðar, BÍ'88 and BÍ/Bolungarvík) and earned international caps at senior level. Correct as of 1 May 2021.

Managerial history

Honours
3. deild karla
 Winners (1): 1988
 Runner-up (1): 2008
2. deild karla
 Runner-up (3): 1991, 2010, 2019

Women's

History
After ÍBÍ women's team folded before the 1988 season, a women's team was founded under the BÍ'88 name and took its spot in the top-tier 1. deild kvenna. They won the then second-tier 2. deild kvenna in 1989 but withdrew from the top-tier 1. deild kvenna prior to the 1990 season and did not field a team again until 1992. The team last played during the 2015 season in the second-tier 1. deild kvenna when it fielded a joint team with Íþróttafélag Reykjavíkur under the name ÍR/BÍ/Bolungarvík.

Player of the year

Former notable players
Players who have played for Vestri (Badmintonfélag Ísafjarðar, BÍ'88 and BÍ/Bolungarvík) and earned international caps at senior level. Correct as of 20 March 2019.

Managerial history

Honours
1. deild kvenna
 Winners (1): 1989

References

External links
 Official Website

Football clubs in Iceland
Association football clubs established in 2006
2006 establishments in Iceland
Íþróttafélagið Vestri